Sony Max (known popularly as Set Max) is an Indian pay television entertainment channel which is a sister channel to Sony Entertainment Television, operated by Culver Max Entertainment. The channel started broadcasting on 20 July 1999 and is available internationally. It launched a HD simulcast version on 25 December 2015.

Programming
Its main audience attraction, other than Hindi-language movies, was the Twenty20 cricket tournament Indian Premier League (IPL), which the channel had been broadcasting since the tournament's launch in 2008 till 2017, after which it sold the broadcasting rights to Star Sports. It also airs complimentary cricket talk show programmes like Extraaa Innings T20. It occasionally airs Hollywood movies and WWE matches in Hindi. Sony Max is one of the most watched television channels of India, as of July 2018 the second most popular in the country, as well as the top Bollywood channel in the UK that month, ahead of rivals like Zee Cinema.

Availability

Outside India
An HD simulcast feed of the European version was launched on Sky in UK on 1 August 2017.

An SD Feed is Available Across all Countries such as United States, Canada (Distribution by Asian Television Network), Caribbean, United Kingdom, Europe, Mauritius, South Africa, Middle East, Sri Lanka, Thailand, Maldives, Bangladesh, Hong Kong, Singapore, Australia, Nepal , New Zealand and South Korea.

Associated channels

Sony Max 2 
For details, see Sony Max 2

Sony Wah 

Sony Wah, launched on 8 May 2016, is an Indian television channel owned by Culver Max Entertainment . It is targeted towards audience of small towns and rural areas in the country and its programming consists on Hindi-language movies and southern Indian films dubbed in that language.

References

External links
 

Television stations in Mumbai
Hindi-language television channels in India
Sony Pictures Entertainment
Television channels and stations established in 1999
Sony Pictures Networks India
Indian Premier League on television
Movie channels in India
1999 establishments in Maharashtra